Marko Vučetić (born 24 June 1986) is a Serbian football midfielder who plays for FK Kolubara.

References

External links

 Marko Vučetić stats at utakmica.rs 
 

1986 births
Living people
Footballers from Belgrade
Serbian footballers
FK Dorćol players
FK Radnički Beograd players
FK Železničar Beograd players
FK Inđija players
FK Bregalnica Štip players
FK Ekranas players
Adanaspor footballers
FK Napredak Kruševac players
FK Radnik Surdulica players
FK Bežanija players
FK Novi Pazar players
FK Sloboda Užice players
FK Kolubara players
Serbian First League players
Macedonian First Football League players
A Lyga players
Serbian SuperLiga players
TFF First League players
Serbian expatriate footballers
Expatriate footballers in North Macedonia
Serbian expatriate sportspeople in North Macedonia
Expatriate footballers in Lithuania
Serbian expatriate sportspeople in Lithuania
Expatriate footballers in Turkey
Serbian expatriate sportspeople in Turkey
Association football midfielders